Sir John Goodricke, 1st Baronet (20 April 1617 – November 1670) was an English landowner and politician who sat in the House of Commons from 1661 to 1670. He supported the Royalist cause in the English Civil War.

Life
Goodricke was the son of Sir Henry Goodricke of Ribston Hall, Yorkshire and his wife Jane Savile, daughter of Sir John Savile, of Methley, (1545–1607),  Baron of the Exchequer. Though he is said to have been born in 1617 he was baptised at St Mary's York on 31 August 1620.  He matriculated at Jesus College, Cambridge in 1633. After then studying at Aberdeen, he then travelled in France in the later 1630s.

Goodricke succeeded his father on 22 July 1641, and was created a baronet on 14 August 1641. During the Civil Wars he supported the king and suffered  in the Royal cause. He was imprisoned at Manchester and later in the Tower of London and was fined £1,508, (or £1,200, with £40 a year) on 23 November 1646.

In 1661, Goodricke was elected Member of Parliament for Yorkshire in the Cavalier Parliament and sat until his death in 1670. 
 
Goodricke married  firstly  Katharine Norcliffe, daughter of Stephen Norcliffe, of York, at Trinity, Micklegate, York, on 7 October 1641. He married secondly before 1665, Elizabeth Dow, Viscountess Fairfax of Elmley, daughter of Alexander Smith, of Stutton, Suffolk.

References

External links
Goodricke family tree

1617 births
1670 deaths
English MPs 1661–1679
Baronets in the Baronetage of England
English landowners